Béla Jurcsek (30 August 1893 – 1945) was a Hungarian politician, who served as Minister of Agriculture in 1944 and Minister of Welfare between 1944 and 1945.

He was born into a landowning family. He attended secondary school in Nagykároly and studied economy in Debrecen. Then he travelled abroad and also worked briefly in Germany. After the First World War he took part in the political life of Fejér County. From 1916 he was a member of the county's municipality and became chairman of the Alliance of Social Associations' group in Sárbogárd. He also founded the local organization of the Revisionist League. After that he went abroad again (Austria, Italy, Germany). He became chairman of the Party of National Unity (NEP) in Sárbogárd. 
He was elected a member of the National Assembly in 1935 and in 1939 as a representative of the NEP.

In Parliament, he gave speeches mainly on agricultural and social policy issues. He was a member of the party's committee which examined the Jewish question and of the special delegation which smoothed the differences between the House of Magnates and the House of Representatives in connection with the second Jewish law. From June 1940 to February 1941, he served as governor of agricultural processing and marketing. Jurcsek also served as state secretary of the Ministry of Welfare between 1942 and 1944. He devised a delivery system which later was called after him the Jurcsek system. This program tried to improve the deteriorating situation because of the Second World War. The problem had also appeared during the First World War. Jurcsek wanted to eliminate the black market and hiding.

After the Nazi occupation of Hungary (Operation Margarethe) in the cabinet of Döme Sztójay, he was appointed Minister of Agriculture. He also held this position in the next government, that of Géza Lakatos. After the Arrow Cross Party's coup d'état (Operation Mickey Mouse), he served as Minister of Welfare. He set up the delivery system which served the needs of the German Army to the detriment of the Hungarian Army and population. He escaped to Austria. When the Soviet Red Army arrived at Zell am See, he committed suicide. The delivery system was also used after World War II.

References
 Magyar Életrajzi Lexikon	

Arrow Cross Party politicians
Agriculture ministers of Hungary
Hungarian collaborators with Nazi Germany
Holocaust perpetrators in Hungary
1893 births
1945 deaths
Hungarian politicians who committed suicide
Suicides in Austria
Unity Party (Hungary) politicians
People from Borsod-Abaúj-Zemplén County
People from the Kingdom of Hungary
1945 suicides